Regius Professors of Modern History may refer to:

 Regius Professor of Modern History (Cambridge)
 Regius Professor of Modern History (Oxford)